OGLE-2018-BLG-1119Lb is a Jupiter-like gas giant exoplanet located  away, orbiting its host star at a distance of 4.06 AU and taking two years to complete one orbit. It is 0.91 times the mass of Jupiter. It was discovered in 2022 by gravitational microlensing.

Reference 

Exoplanets detected by microlensing
Exoplanets discovered in 2022